A Slave of Vanity is a 1920 American silent drama film starring Pauline Frederick, and directed and written by Henry Otto. The film, which was adapted from Arthur Wing Pinero's 1901 play Iris, was produced and distributed by the Robertson-Cole Pictures Corporation that eventually became part of Film Booking Office of America. The film is now considered lost.

Plot
Iris (Frederick), a British aristocrat, must choose between the poor Laurence (Barrie) and the rich Frederick (Louis). She decides to marry the wealthier Frederick, but at the last minute she changes her mind and runs off to Italy with Laurence. However, things do not work out quite the way she planned.

Cast
 Pauline Frederick as Iris Bellamy
 Arthur Hoyt as Croker Harrington
 Nigel Barrie as Laurence Trenwith
 Willard Louis as Frederick Maldonado
 Maude Louis as Fanny Sullivan
 Daisy Jefferson as Aurea Vyse
 Ruth Handforth as Miss Pinsent
 Howard Gaye as Arthur Kane

See also
List of lost films

References

External links

 
 

1920 films
1920 drama films
Silent American drama films
American silent feature films
American black-and-white films
American films based on plays
Films directed by Henry Otto
Lost American films
Film Booking Offices of America films
Films set in England
1920 lost films
Lost drama films
1920s American films